Retinoschisin also known as X-linked juvenile retinoschisis protein is a lectin that in humans is encoded by the RS1 gene.

It is a soluble, cell-surface protein that plays an important role in the maintenance of the retina where it is expressed and secreted by retinal bipolar cells and photoreceptors, as well as in the pineal gland. Retinoschisin (RS1) is encoded by the gene RS1 located on the X chromosome at p22.1. Young males who have an RS1 mutation are susceptible to retinoschisis, and X-linked eye disease which causes macular degeneration and can lead to a loss of vision.

Function 
Retinoschisin is an extracellular protein that plays a crucial role in the cellular organization of the retina: it binds the plasma membranes of various retinal cells tightly to maintain the structure of the retina. In addition to enabling cell-to-cell adhesion, it has been shown that retinoschisin interacts with the sodium/potassium-ATPase (Na/K-ATPase) which resides in the plasma membrane. RS1 also plays a role in the regulation on intracellular MAP kinase signalling.

Structure 
The retinoschisin monomer is 224 amino acids long, including a 23-amino acid signal peptide essential for secretion (this is cleaved off before the protein becomes functional), and a highly conserved sequence motif called the discoidin domain which consists of 157 amino acids, important for the protein's function in cell to cell adhesion. However, its oligomeric structure is a pairing of back-to-back octamers, forming a homo16mer . This structure allows it to adhere to the plasma membrane of retinal cells such as bipolar and photoreceptor cells, joining them together.

Clinical significance
Pathogenic mutations of this gene are responsible for X-linked retinoschisis an early-onset macular degeneration in males that results in a splitting of the inner layers of the retina and severe loss in vision. Female carriers of the RS1 mutation do not show symptoms of X-linked juvenile retinoschisis, except in rare cases where the non-functional protein is expressed due to anomalous X-chromosome inactivation. In young males who carry a gene mutation, the disease presents itself as retinal cavities, splitting of inner retinal layers (also known as foveal schisis), and defective synapse activity. Retinas that lack mature retinoshisin develop these characteristics in up to 1 in 5,000 males. There are over 200 mutations of RS1 recorded in the Retina International Mutation Database, most of which are not pathogenic.

References

Further reading

External links 
 GeneReview/NCBI/NIH/UW entry on X-Linked Juvenile Retinoschisis